Evan Gordon (born 26 September 1960) is a South African cricketer. He played twenty first-class matches for Western Province and New South Wales between 1978/79 and 1983/84.

See also
 List of New South Wales representative cricketers

References

External links
 

1960 births
Living people
South African cricketers
Western Province cricketers
New South Wales cricketers
Cricketers from Cape Town